Chapin Hall (July 12, 1816 – September 12, 1879) was a Republican  United States Representative from Pennsylvania. He served as Representative from 1859 until 1861.

Biographer
Chapin Hall was born in Busti, New York.  He attended the common schools and the Jamestown Academy in Jamestown, New York.  He moved to Pine Grove (now Russell), Warren County, Pennsylvania, about 1841 and engaged in the lumber business and mercantile pursuits.  He moved to Warren, Pennsylvania, in 1851 and engaged in banking.

Hall was elected as a Republican to the Thirty-sixth Congress.  He was not a candidate for renomination in 1860.  He was interested in the manufacture of lumber products at Louisville, Kentucky, Fond du Lac, Wisconsin, and Newark, New Jersey, and in the manufacture of worsted goods at Jamestown, New York.  He died in Jamestown in 1879.  Interment in Lake View Cemetery.

References

Sources

The Political Graveyard

1816 births
1879 deaths
People from Busti, New York
Republican Party members of the United States House of Representatives from Pennsylvania
19th-century American politicians